T700 may refer to:
 General Electric T700, a family of turboshaft and turboprop engines
 Sony Ericsson T700, a mid-range mobile phone
 T-700, a fictional robot from Terminator series
 Tatra 700, a Czech car